Olympic Council of Malaysia, or commonly OCM or MOM, (IOC code: MAS) is the National Olympic Committee representing Malaysia. It is also the body responsible for Malaysia's representation at the Commonwealth Games.

History
The body was founded in 1953 as the Federation of Malaya Olympic Council (FMOC). The FMOC received its recognition as the National Olympic Committee of the Federation of Malaya in May 1954. On 16 September 1963, Singapore and the British crown colonies of North Borneo and Sarawak joined the Federation of Malaya to form Malaysia. On 5 May 1964, the Singapore Olympic and Sports Council, the Sarawak Sports Olympic Committee and the Sabah Olympic Committee and the FMOC was merged to form the Olympic Council of Malaysia. On 9 August 1965, Singapore ceased to be part of Malaysia and re-established its own National Olympic Committee.

List of Presidents
E. M. McDonald 
Henry Lee Hau Shik
Abdul Razak Hussein
1976–1998: Hamzah Abu Samah
1998–2018: Tunku Imran
2018–Present: Mohamad Norza Zakaria

See also
 Malaysia at the Olympics
 Malaysia at the Youth Olympics
 Malaysia at the Commonwealth Games
 Paralympic Council of Malaysia

References

External links
 Olympic Council of Malaysia
 Olympic Council of Malaysia at Olympic Council of Asia website

Malaysia
Malaysia
Malaysia at the Olympics
1953 establishments in Malaya
Oly
Sports organizations established in 1953